Courtney Gains (born August 22, 1965) is an American character actor best known for his portrayal of Malachai in the 1984 horror movie Children of the Corn.

Career
Gains achieved success during the 1980s with a variety of roles in films such as Children of the Corn, Hardbodies, Lust in the Dust, Back to the Future, Can't Buy Me Love, Secret Admirer, Colors, The 'Burbs, and Memphis Belle. Later films include Sweet Home Alabama, Dorm Daze (which he also executive-produced), Desolation Canyon, and a cameo in Rob Zombie's Halloween remake.

In addition to his film work, Gains appeared in the video game Wing Commander III: Heart of the Tiger and guest-starred on episodes of various television series, including Seinfeld, Monk, In the Heat of the Night, ER, JAG, Nash Bridges, Diagnosis: Murder, Charmed, Alias and My Name is Earl. Gains has also worked as an acting coach.

Gains worked as a musician and once performed live on stage with Phish, appearing at the band's December 6, 1996 concert in Las Vegas, which was later released on CD as Vegas 96. Gains has since released a solo album.

Filmography

 Children of the Corn (1984) as Malachai
 Hardbodies (1984) as "Rag"
 Lust in the Dust (1985) as "Red Dick" Barker
 Secret Admirer (1985) as Doug
 Back to the Future (1985) as Dixon
 Ratboy (1986) as Kid In Car
 Winners Take All (1987) as "Goose" Trammel
 Can't Buy Me Love (1987) as Kenneth Wurman
 Colors (1988) as "Whitey"
 The 'Burbs (1989) as Hans Klopek
 Memphis Belle (1990) as Sergeant Eugene McVey
 Behind Enemy Lines (1997) as Church
 Dilemma (1997) as "Tex"
 Shadow of Doubt (1998) as Ernie
 The Landlady (1998) as Tyson Johns
 No Code of Conduct (1998) as Cameron
 Dreamers (1999) as Mike
 Her Married Lover (1999) as Hood
 Sweet Home Alabama (2002) as Sheriff Wade
 National Lampoon Presents Dorm Daze (2003) as Lorenzo, The Black Hand
 Freezerburn (2005) as "Scooter", The Grip
 The Phobic (2006) as Dr. Cecil Westlake
 Halloween (2007) as Jack Kendall (uncredited)
 Alien Encounter (2008) as Donovan
 Sibling Rivalry (2009) as The Stranger
 He's Such a Girl (2009) as Barrista
 Benny Bliss and the Disciples of Greatness (2009) as Benny Bliss
 The Ascent (2010) as Andrew
 Cinema Salvation (2010) as Courtney
 The Quiet Ones (2010) as Michael's Father
 Raven (2010) as Danny
 Faster (2010) Prescott Ashton, The Telemarketer
 Watch Out for Slick (2010) as "Benji"
 Discipline (2011) as Jack Baldwin
 Poolboy: Drowning Out the Fury (2011) as Gil Highdecker
 L.A. Noire (2011) as Eli Rooney
 Mimesis: Night of the Living Dead (2011) as Gordon
 Ambush at Dark Canyon (2012) as Sheriff Hurley
 The House Across the Street (2013) as Ned
 My Trip Back to the Dark Side (2014) as Bobby G.
 Field of Lost Shoes (2014) as Captain Chinook
 Halcyon (2014) as Robert
 The Funhouse Massacre (2015) as Dennis
 The Bronx Bull (2016) as Chain Gang Guard
 Eden Falls (2017) as Dr. Mason
 It Happened One Valentine's (2017) as Freddy Craig
 Goodnight, Gracie (2017) as Billy
 Urban Myths (2017) as Stanley
 Camp Cold Brook (2018) as 
 Hell's Kitty (2018) as Mordicia
 Candy Corn (2019) as Sheriff Sam Bramford
 Charming the Hearts of Men (2021) as Mr. Spratz
 Hellblazers (2022) as Bernard
 Grand Theft Auto Online (2022) as Labrat
 The Wrath of Becky (2023)

References

External links
 Convicted Artist Magazine - Courtney Gains Interview

1965 births
American male film actors
American male television actors
Living people
Male actors from Los Angeles
20th-century American male actors
21st-century American male actors
American male video game actors